Andrei Ivanovich Lyakh (born 24 September 1990) is a Russian professional football player. He plays for FC Tekstilshchik Ivanovo.

Club career
He made his debut in the Russian Professional Football League for FC Khimik Dzerzhinsk on 29 April 2009 in a game against FC Volga Ulyanovsk.
He made his Russian Football National League debut for FC Zhemchuzhina-Sochi on 24 August 2010 in a game against FC Krasnodar.
He made his Russian Premier League debut for FC Arsenal Tula on 2 August 2014 in a game against FC Zenit Saint Petersburg.

Personal life
He is a son of Ivan Lyakh and the nephew of Vagiz Khidiyatullin.

References

External links
 
 
 Profile by Football National League

1990 births
Sportspeople from Rostov-on-Don
Living people
Russian footballers
Association football midfielders
FC Zhemchuzhina Sochi players
Russian expatriate footballers
Expatriate footballers in Lithuania
FC Arsenal Tula players
Russian Premier League players
FC Tom Tomsk players
FC Shinnik Yaroslavl players
FC Rostov players
FC Torpedo Moscow players
FC Anzhi Makhachkala players
FC Khimik Dzerzhinsk players
FC Spartak Kostroma players
FC SKA Rostov-on-Don players
FC Chayka Peschanokopskoye players
FC Tekstilshchik Ivanovo players